The Cobán Guatemala Temple is a temple of the Church of Jesus Christ of Latter-day Saints (LDS Church) that is being built in Cobán's 2nd ward, and is estimated to be completed in late 2023. It will be Guatemala's third temple, with the two other ones being the Guatemala City Guatemala and Quetzaltenango Guatemala temples.

The temple is located 5.4 acre site, adjacent to an existing meetinghouse. It will be one-story tall and have about 8,800 square feet of space. Plans call for a patron housing facility and a meetinghouse will be built on the site as well.

A groundbreaking ceremony, to signify beginning of construction, was held on November 14, 2020, with Brian K. Taylor, president of the LDS Church's Central America Area, presiding.

See also 

 The Church of Jesus Christ of Latter-day Saints in Guatemala

References 

Temples (LDS Church) in North America
21st-century Latter Day Saint temples
Buildings and structures in Cobán
Temples (LDS Church) in Latin America
The Church of Jesus Christ of Latter-day Saints in Guatemala
Temples (LDS Church) in Guatemala
Buildings and structures under construction